Vandercook Lake is an unincorporated community and census-designated place (CDP) in Jackson County in the U.S. state of Michigan. The population of the CDP was 4,721 at the 2010 census.  It is located within Summit Township.

Geography

The community is in central Jackson County, in the eastern part of Summit Township. It sits on the eastern side of Vandercook Lake, a water body on the Grand River. Part of the community is bordered to the north by the city of Jackson, the county seat. U.S. Route 127 forms the eastern edge of the CDP; the highway leads north  to Interstate 94 northeast of Jackson and south  to Hudson.

Demographics

As of the census of 2000, there were 4,809 people, 1,847 households, and 1,346 families residing in the CDP. The racial makeup of the CDP was 96.13% White, 1.19% Black or African American, 0.54% Native American, 0.06% Asian, 0.04% Pacific Islander, 0.56% from other races, and 1.48% from two or more races. Hispanic or Latino of any race were 2.39% of the population.

There were 1,847 households, out of which 34.3% had children under the age of 18 living with them, 56.6% were married couples living together, 11.7% had a female householder with no husband present, and 27.1% were non-families. 23.6% of all households were made up of individuals, and 10.3% had someone living alone who was 65 years of age or older.  The average household size was 2.60 and the average family size was 3.07.

In the CDP, the population was spread out, with 27.2% under the age of 18, 7.5% from 18 to 24, 29.6% from 25 to 44, 21.8% from 45 to 64, and 13.9% who were 65 years of age or older.  The median age was 36 years. For every 100 females, there were 93.1 males.  For every 100 females age 18 and over, there were 92.5 males.

The median income for a household in the CDP was $40,238, and the median income for a family was $49,115. Males had a median income of $36,555 versus $25,222 for females. The per capita income for the CDP was $17,359.  About 3.7% of families and 5.7% of the population were below the poverty line, including 7.3% of those under age 18 and 3.6% of those age 65 or over.

School district
Vandercook Lake is served by the Vandercook Lake Public Schools district, which includes 
 Vandercook Lake High/Middle School
 Townsend Elementary School - Now used for child care, preschool and grades K-5.
 McDevitt School - No longer in use and is now a vacant building.

The high school mascot is the Jayhawk. The district's sports teams also use the nickname "Vandy" on uniforms and in cheers.

Recreation 
Vandercook Lake County Park is a  park that includes a swim area, three ball diamonds, a boat launch, playground area, fishing area, grills, two picnic shelters, and modern restrooms. Quiet World Sports operates a kayak livery from the park.

References

External links
 Vandercook Lake Public Schools

Unincorporated communities in Jackson County, Michigan
Census-designated places in Michigan
Unincorporated communities in Michigan
Census-designated places in Jackson County, Michigan